William Baxter (1760 – November 22, 1832) was a physician, businessman and political figure in Nova Scotia. He represented Cornwallis Township from 1793 to 1799 in the Nova Scotia House of Assembly.

He was born in New Hampshire, the son of Captain Simon Baxter and Prudence Fox. In 1783, he married Ruth Sheffield. Baxter later married Julia Swigo. He was one of the first physicians in Kings County, Nova Scotia. He died in Cornwallis, Nova Scotia.

References 
 A Directory of the Members of the Legislative Assembly of Nova Scotia, 1758–1958, Public Archives of Nova Scotia (1958)

1760 births
1832 deaths
Nova Scotia pre-Confederation MLAs
Loyalists who settled Nova Scotia